Kärdla-Nõmme (until 2017 Nõmme) is a village in Hiiumaa Parish, Hiiu County in northwestern Estonia.

Historically, the areas of village were part of Kärdla Manor.

Kärdla-Nõmme got its village status in 1997. Before 1977 the village was part of Tubala village, and earlier part of Kärdla settlement.

References
 

Villages in Hiiu County